Harlow is a constituency represented in the House of Commons of the UK Parliament since 2010 by Robert Halfon, a Conservative.

History 
This seat was created for the February 1974 general election from the abolished seat of Epping, and has been subject only to minor changes since.

Boundaries and boundary changes 

1974–1983: The Urban District of Harlow, and in the Rural District of Epping and Ongar the parishes of Magdalen Laver, Matching, Nazeing, North Weald Bassett, Roydon, and Sheering.

1983–1997: The District of Harlow, and the District of Epping Forest wards of Nazeing, North Weald Bassett, Roydon, and Sheering.

Minor loss to Brentwood and Ongar.

1997–2010: The District of Harlow, and the District of Epping Forest wards of Nazeing, Roydon, and Sheering.

North Weald Bassett transferred to Epping Forest.

2010–present: The District of Harlow, and the District of Epping Forest wards of Hastingwood, Matching and Sheering Village, Lower Nazeing, Lower Sheering, and Roydon.

Marginal changes due to redistribution of local authority wards.

Constituency profile
The seat has been a bellwether since the result in 1983.  Included are above county-average levels of social housing, underemployment and unemployment as at the 2001 census and the associated 2000 Index of Multiple Deprivation; however, the new town has brought growth sustained in part by more commuting, with an increasingly-used and separate Mill station in the London Commuter Belt, and has seen a 9.2% increase in the number of apartments to 2011, which brings the proportion of the housing market made up by flats and apartments to 23.8%.

Members of Parliament

Elections

Elections in the 2010s

Elections in the 2000s

Elections in the 1990s

Elections in the 1980s

Elections in the 1970s

Graphical representation

See also 
 List of parliamentary constituencies in Essex

Notes

References

External links
 BBC News coverage

Parliamentary constituencies in Essex
Constituencies of the Parliament of the United Kingdom established in 1974
Harlow